Sarcoprosena is a genus of parasitic flies in the family Tachinidae.

Species
Sarcoprosena luteola Cortés & Campos, 1974
Sarcoprosena rufiventris Townsend, 1929
Sarcoprosena triangulifera Townsend, 1927

References

Dexiinae
Diptera of South America
Taxa named by Charles Henry Tyler Townsend
Tachinidae genera